Xandria is a German symphonic metal band.

Xandria may also refer to:

 Xandria (moth), an insect genus
 Xandria Ooi, a Malaysian writer and television host
 Xandria Phillips, a U.S. poet and artist
 XandriaCollection, a website selling erotica and pornography

See also

 Alexandria (disambiguation)
 Alexandra (disambiguation)
 Alexander (disambiguation)
 Sandra (disambiguation)
 Zander (disambiguation)